The Deserter or Deserter (s) may refer to:

Film and television
 The Deserter (1912 film), a silent film by Thomas H. Ince
 The Deserter (1933 film), a film by Vsevolod Pudovkin
 The Deserter (1971 film), a film by Burt Kennedy
 Deserter (2002 film), a film starring Tom Hardy
 The Deserter (2008 film), a Canadian film by Simon Lavoie
 "The Deserter" (Avatar: The Last Airbender), the sixteenth episode in the television series Avatar: The Last Airbender

Literature
 "The Deserter" (poem), a 1916 war poem by Winifred Mary Letts
 The Deserter (1964 book), a 1964 novel by Douglas LePan
 The Deserter, a 2010 novel by Paul Almond

Music
Deserter (song), a song by Matthew Dear
 Deserters (album), a 1992 album by the Oysterband
 "The Deserter", a traditional song featured on Fairport Convention's album Liege & Lief
 "The Deserter", the English version of "Le Déserteur"

Other
 Deserters Group, a group of islands in the Queen Charlotte Strait region of the Central Coast of British Columbia, Canada
 Deserters Island, an island in that group
 "The Deserter", an unpublished comics feature by DC Comics, with the first issue premiering in Cancelled Comic Cavalcade

See also
 Desertion (disambiguation)